Carpocoris is a genus of shield bug in the family Pentatomidae. The species of this genus are quite similar.

Distribution
The species of this genus are widespread in most of Europe.

Species

Gallery

References

 Rider D.A., 2004 - Family Pentatomidae - Catalogue of the Heteroptera of the Palaearctic Region

External links

 Biolib

Pentatomidae
Pentatomomorpha genera